Panagiotis Zachariou (born 26 February 1996) is a Cypriot professional footballer who plays as a winger for Cypriot First Division club Omonia and the Cyprus national team. He has previously played for Pafos and Olympiakos Nicosia.

International career
Zachariou made his international debut for Cyprus on 16 November 2018, starting in the 2018–19 UEFA Nations League C match against Bulgaria. He opened the scoring for Cyprus in the 24th minute, before being substituted out in the 67th minute for Onisiforos Roushias. The match finished as a 1–1 home draw.

Career statistics

Club

International

International goals

Honours
 Omonia
Cypriot Cup: 2021–22

References

External links
 
 

1996 births
Living people
Cypriot footballers
Cyprus under-21 international footballers
Cyprus international footballers
Association football forwards
Pafos FC players
Cypriot First Division players
Olympiakos Nicosia players